Castle Rock is an island in Alaska in the United States. It is one of the Shumagin Islands.  Castle Rock is in Aleutians East Borough, and is located off the south coast of the Alaska Peninsula at 55.27917° North Latitude 159.49944° West Longitude. A Barnegat-class seaplane tender, the USS Castle Rock (AVP-35), was named for the island.

References
Citations

External Links
Trails.com Castle Rock USGS Stepovak Bay Quad, Alaska, Topographic Map

Shumagin Islands
Islands of Alaska
Islands of Aleutians East Borough, Alaska